Henry V may refer to:

People
 Henry V, Duke of Bavaria (died 1026)
 Henry V, Holy Roman Emperor (1081/86–1125)
 Henry V, Duke of Carinthia (died 1161)
 Henry V, Count Palatine of the Rhine (–1227)
 Henry V, Count of Luxembourg (1216–1281)
 Henry V, Duke of Legnica (–1296)
 Henry V, Count of Gorizia (died 1362)
 Henry V of Iron, Duke of Żagań, half-Głogów, and half-Ścinawa
 Henry V of England (1386-1422)
 Henry V of Rosenberg (1456–1489)
 Henry V, Duke of Mecklenburg (1479–1552)
 Henry V, Duke of Brunswick-Lüneburg (1489–1568)
 Henry V, Burgrave of Plauen (1533–1568)
 Henri, Count of Chambord, nominally Henry V of France, (1820–1883)

Media
 Henry V (play), a history play by Shakespeare named after the King of England
 Henry V (1944 film), a film by Laurence Olivier
Suite from Henry V, William Walton's music from the Olivier film
 Henry V (1989 film), a film by Kenneth Branagh
 Henry V (2012 film), a film by Thea Sharrock